Ontario Nature is a non-profit organization based in Toronto that promotes the preservation and conservation of wild species and spaces in the Canadian province of Ontario. It was established in 1931 as the Federation of Ontario Naturalists and changed its name to Ontario Nature' in 2004.

Ontario Nature maintains its own system of 24 nature reserves, totalling 2,788 hectares. It creates parks and nature reserves. It also provides public education about nature. Ontario Nature publishes a quarterly magazine called ON Nature, formerly called Seasons.

References

General references
 Information Niagara: Ontario Nature
 Ontario Nature: Milestones
 Halton Environment: Ontario Nature

External links
 Ontario Nature
Federation of Ontario Naturalists archival papers held at the University of Toronto Archives and Records Management Services

Organizations based in Toronto
Environmental organizations based in Ontario